Melvin Gerald West (January 14, 1939 —  November 20, 2003) was an American football running back who played in the American Football League. He played college football at Missouri.

College career
Along with Norris Stevenson who was the first, West was the second  African American scholarship player at Missouri. He led the Tigers in rushing  and total offense for three straight seasons. West was named first-team All-Big Eight Conference as a senior in 1960 and rushing for 650 yards and scoring five touchdowns. West left Missouri as the school's all-time leading rusher with 1,848 yards and was inducted into the Athletic Hall of Fame in 1993.

Professional career
West was selected by the St. Louis Cardinals in the 15th round of the 1961 NFL Draft and by the Boston Patriots in the 11th round of the 1961 AFL Draft and opted to sign with the Patriots. After four games with the Patriots, West was released and was signed by the New York Titans. West scored two touchdowns in the Titans' season finale against the Dallas Texans. He finished the season with 72 carries for 322 yards and three touchdowns, 13 receptions for 146 yards and 13 kickoffs returned for 306 yards. West was cut by the Titans three games into the 1962 season following a knee injury.

Post-football
After the end of his football career West returned to Missouri and graduated with a master's degree in education. He moved to Minnesota and was a principal for Minneapolis Public Schools for 23 years. West died on November 20, 2003 in Burnsville, Minnesota. Norris Stevenson outlived him and died in 2013.

References

External links
Missouri Tigers Hall of Fame bio

1939 births
2003 deaths
Missouri Tigers football players
Players of American football from Missouri
Boston Patriots players
New York Titans (AFL) players
American football running backs
Sportspeople from Columbia, Missouri
Sportspeople from Jefferson City, Missouri